Andy McQueen (born, March 2, 1991) is a Canadian actor. He is most noted for his performance in the 2019 film Disappearance at Clifton Hill, for which he received a Canadian Screen Award nomination for Best Supporting Actor at the 8th Canadian Screen Awards in 2020, and his recurring role as Detective Malik Abed in the television series Coroner.

He also appeared in the films Brown Girl Begins (2017), Fahrenheit 451 (2018), Books of Blood (2020), Sugar Daddy (2020), Little Orphans (2020) and I Like Movies (2022), in the television series The Handmaid's Tale, Jack Ryan, The Girlfriend Experience and Station Eleven, and on stage in the Toronto production of Jesus Hopped the 'A' Train.

He is an alumnus of the Actors Conservatory at the Canadian Film Centre.

Filmography

Film

Television

Video Games

References

External links

21st-century Canadian male actors
Canadian male film actors
Canadian male television actors
Canadian male voice actors
Canadian male stage actors
Canadian Film Centre alumni
Living people
1991 births